The Earth phase, Terra phase, terrestrial phase, or phase of Earth, is the shape of the directly sunlit portion of Earth as viewed from the Moon (or elsewhere extraterrestrially). From the Moon, the Earth phases gradually and cyclically change over the period of a synodic month (about 29.53 days), as the orbital positions of the Moon around Earth and of Earth around the Sun shift.

Overview 

Among the most prominent features of the Moon's sky is Earth. Earth's angular diameter (1.9°) is four times the Moon's as seen from Earth, although because the Moon's orbit is eccentric, Earth's apparent size in the sky varies by about 5% either way (ranging between 1.8° and 2.0° in diameter). Earth shows phases, just like the Moon does for terrestrial observers. The phases, however, are opposite; when the terrestrial observer sees the full Moon, the lunar observer sees a "new Earth", and vice versa. Earth's albedo is three times as high as that of the Moon (due in part to its whitish cloud cover), and coupled with the wider area, the full Earth glows over 50 times brighter than the full Moon at zenith does for the terrestrial observer. This Earth light reflected on the Moon's un-sunlit half is bright enough to be visible from Earth, even to the unaided eye – a phenomenon known as earthshine.

As a result of the Moon's synchronous rotation, one side of the Moon (the "near side") is permanently turned towards Earth, and the other side, the "far side", mostly cannot be seen from Earth. This means, conversely, that Earth can be seen only from the near side of the Moon and would always be invisible from the far side. The Earth is seen from the lunar surface to rotate, with a period of approximately one Earth day (differing slightly due to the Moon's orbital motion).

If the Moon's rotation were purely synchronous, Earth would not have any noticeable movement in the Moon's sky. However, due to the Moon's libration, Earth does perform a slow and complex wobbling movement. Once a month, as seen from the Moon, Earth traces out an approximate oval 18° in diameter. The exact shape and orientation of this oval depend on one's location on the Moon. As a result, near the boundary of the near and far sides of the Moon, Earth is sometimes below the horizon and sometimes above it.

To be aware, although genuine photographs of the Earth viewed from the Moon exist, many from NASA, some photographs shared on social media, that are purported to be the Earth viewed from the Moon, may not be real.

Eclipses from the Moon 
Earth and the Sun sometimes meet in the lunar sky, causing an eclipse. On Earth, one would see a lunar eclipse, when the Moon passes through the Earth's shadow; meanwhile on the Moon, one would see a solar eclipse, when the Sun goes behind the Earth. Since the apparent diameter of the Earth is four times as large as that of the Sun, the Sun would be hidden behind the Earth for hours. Earth's atmosphere would be visible as a reddish ring. During the Apollo 15 mission, an attempt was made to use the Lunar Roving Vehicle's TV camera to view such an eclipse, but the camera or its power source failed after the astronauts left for Earth.

Terrestrial solar eclipses, on the other hand, would not be as spectacular for lunar observers because the Moon's umbra nearly tapers out at the Earth's surface. A blurry dark patch would be barely visible. Lunar observers with telescopes might be able to discern the umbral shadow as a black spot at the center of a less dark region (penumbra) traveling across the full Earth's disk. It would look essentially the same as it does to the Deep Space Climate Observatory, which orbits Earth at the L1 Lagrangian point in the Sun-Earth system,  from Earth.

In summary, whenever an eclipse of some sort is occurring on Earth, an eclipse of another sort is occurring on the Moon. Eclipses occur for observers on both Earth and the Moon whenever the two bodies and the Sun align in a straight line, or syzygy.

Phases of the Earth

See also 

 Earthrise
 Extraterrestrial sky
 List of first images of Earth from space
 List of notable images of Earth from space
 Lunar phase
 Overview effect
 Pale Blue Dot
 Pale Orange Dot (Early Earth)
 Planetary phase
 The Blue Marble
 The Day the Earth Smiled

References

External links 
 Earth phases – model simulation program
 
 

phase
Observational astronomy